The Castle of Chios is a medieval citadel in Chios town on the Greek island of Chios.

Layout and history

The castle is situated adjacent to the main port of Chios, and its east side borders the sea. It consists of an inhabited area surrounded by a large stone wall structure with various fortifications purposed to defend the enclosed population and properties against naval attack and siege.

The castle was constructed in the medieval period, with its first construction phase having started in the 10th century by the Byzantines. The structures surviving to this day are part of later construction and expansion dated to the time when the Genoese, who maintained commercial concerns, ruled the island during the 14th to the 16th century.

Saint George's church
Aghiou Georgiou (Saint George's) Church is located on the main street of the castle, Aghiou Georgiou street. There was initially a Byzantine church dating back to the 10th or 11th century. It later became a Genoese church (San Domenico). Giovanni Giustiniani was buried here. 

Piyale Pasha, an Ottoman admiral, converted the west part of the church into the Eski ("Old") Mosque upon the Ottoman capture of the island in 1566. The mosque was reconstructed after 1881 earthquake and later became the contemporary church of Aghios Georgios.

Turkish baths

In the north of the castle area, there are Turkish baths with typical vaulted roofs. Just after the entrance, the Kria Vrisi tank is on the right hand. It is a large semi-underground water reservoir with vaults forming four quarters divided by a cross on its roof that is supported by eight shafts. Then Chian press of the time mentions that in 1920 the Mayor of Chios and architect Dim. Tselepidis had set out its cleaning. “The pumping of water was originally performed through a large dome-roofed elevated arcade that was extending all along the eastern part of the tank and later on through a short cistern in its southeast corner.” Professor Char. Bouras mentioned about the tank.

See also
 Giovanni Giustiniani

References

External links 
 Chios Castle, Hellenic Ministry of Culture and Tourism 

Buildings and structures in Chios
Castles in Greece
Byzantine fortifications in Greece
Crusader castles